East Didsbury is a suburban railway station in south Manchester, England. On the Styal Line between Longsight (Slade Lane Junction) and Wilmslow, it is served by - and  trains operated by Northern Trains,  -  services operated by Transport for Wales and some peak Manchester Airport services operated by TransPennine Express.

East Didsbury tram stop is close to the railway station.

History
East Didsbury Station was opened in 1909 by the London and North Western Railway and, until 6 May 1974, was called  East Didsbury and Parrs Wood. From 1923, the line was operated by the London Midland and Scottish Railway. Following the formation in 1948 of British Rail, rail services were operated by the London Midland Region of British Railways, then North-Western Regional Railways. The station was rebuilt in the 1959 by the architect to the London Midland section of British Rail, William Robert Headley.

Services to Manchester Airport began in 1993 upon the opening of the Manchester Airport spur. With the privatisation of rail services in 1996/7, East Didsbury was served by the North Western Trains franchise.

Work to extend the platforms at the station is expected to be completed by March 2023.

Other Didsbury stations

Before the Beeching Axe of the 1960s, the Didsbury area was served by three railway stations: East Didsbury, Didsbury, and Withington and West Didsbury.

Didsbury railway station opened in 1880 in the centre of Didsbury Village on the Midland Railway's Manchester South District Line, which connected with the Cheshire Lines Committee line into Manchester Central.  This connected to the Sheffield and Midland Railway Companies' Committee line from Chinley and the Midland Railway used it for its express services from London St Pancras. It closed in 1967 and, though the building was used for a while by a hardware dealer, it has now disappeared, apart from the platforms, a clock tower and a drinking fountain dedicated to the memory of a local philanthropist, Dr. D.J. Wilson Rhodes (1847–1900).

There was also Withington and West Didsbury, the next station on the line towards Manchester; the two being so similar in appearance that passengers sometimes alighted at the wrong one. Originally it was called "Withington", then from 1884 "Withington and Albert Park", receiving its final name in 1915. All that remains is a boundary wall; a block of flats (Brankgate Court) has been built on the site.

The former Midland line was partially re-opened to passengers in 2013 when it was converted into a light rail track for the Manchester Metrolink tram system.

Services
Mondays to Saturdays, the station has a basic service of three trains per hour (tph) each way.

References

Further reading

External links

Didsbury
Railway stations in Manchester
DfT Category E stations
Former London and North Western Railway stations
Railway stations in Great Britain opened in 1909
Northern franchise railway stations
Railway stations served by Transport for Wales Rail
1909 establishments in England
William Robert Headley railway stations